Yael Eisenstat is vice president at the Anti-Defamation League, where she heads the Center for Technology and Society. A long-time democracy activist, she was most recently the Senior Advisor for Tech and Democracy at the Institute for Security and Technology  and a Future of Democracy Fellow at the Berggruen Institute. She was a former Central Intelligence Agency officer, a National Security Advisor to former Vice President Joe Biden, and diplomat. In 2019–2020, she was a visiting fellow at Cornell Tech, focusing on technology's effects on democracy where she taught a course on tech, media and democracy. From 2017 to 2019, she was an adjunct assistant professor at the Center for Global Affairs at New York University. From June - November 2018, she was the Global Head of Elections Integrity Ops for political advertising at Facebook. She has become a vocal critic of the company since leaving. Currently, she specializes in ethics, technology and policy.

Education
Eisenstat holds a B.A. in International Relations from the University of California, Davis and an M.A. in International Affairs and African Studies from the Paul H. Nitze School of Advanced International Studies at Johns Hopkins University.

Career
As Vice President at the Anti-Defamation League and head of the Center for Technology & Society, Yaёl leads ADL's effort to hold tech companies accountable for hate and extremism on their platforms. She works to ensure that online spaces are safe, respectful and inclusive, and helps to lift the voices and experiences of those most impacted by online hate and harassment. As a former CIA analyst and Foreign Service Officer, Eisenstat has worked in many different government agencies, specializing particularly on national security issues in the Middle East and Africa. For nearly a decade, she has worked in counterterrorism and intelligence at the Central Intelligence Agency. From 2004 to 2006, she was a Foreign Service Officer in Nairobi, Kenya, and became Senior Intelligence Officer at the National Counterterrorism Center from 2006 to 2009. In 2009, she was appointed as Special Advisor to Vice President Joe Biden in national security affairs. One year later, she worked as an embedded analyst for the Joint Terrorism Task Force in New York. Eisenstat then spent two years working at ExxonMobil in Irving, Texas from 2013 to 2015.

She founded political risk firm Kilele Global in 2016 and is a member of the Council on Foreign Relations.

In 2017, Yaël Eisenstat was included in Forbes' list of "40 Women to Watch Over 40."

From June to November 2018, Yaël Eisenstat was the global head of elections integrity ops for political advertising at Facebook. She has become a vocal critic of the company since leaving.

In 2019, she was Policy Advisor for the Center for Humane Technology, as well as visiting fellow at Cornell Tech's Digital Life Initiative.

Media
Eisenstat has written for many major newspapers and magazines, including for the New York Times and Time. She has also appeared on CNN, BBC, and other televised news networks. She has been publicly critical of some of Facebook's activities and written outspoken pieces on the company as well as given interviews on it, including about online voter suppression.

In her articles for the New York Times and the Huffington Post, Eisenstat has criticized President Donald Trump's January 2017 speech to the Central Intelligence Agency as disrespectful and self-serving.

Her TED Talk "How Facebook Profits from Polarization" was published online in August 2020.

On 25 September 2020, Eisenstat was named as one of the 25 members of the "Real Facebook Oversight Board", an independent monitoring group over Facebook.

See also
Center for Humane Technology

References

External links

Yaël Eisenstat on LinkedIn
Kilele Global

Living people
People of the Central Intelligence Agency
Obama administration personnel
University of California, Davis alumni
Johns Hopkins University alumni
Year of birth missing (living people)
Facebook employees